The Wyoming Southern Baptist Convention (WSBC) is a group of churches affiliated with the Southern Baptist Convention located in the U.S. state of Wyoming. Headquartered in Casper, Wyoming, it is made up of about 100 churches and 3 Baptist Regions.

Regions
 Northeast Region of the WSBC
 South Region of the WSBC
 West Region of the WSBC

Affiliated Organizations 
Mountain Top Baptist Assembly: An encampment center owned and operated by WSBC.

References

External links 
 WSBC Official Website

 

Christianity in Wyoming
Baptist churches in Wyoming
Protestantism in Wyoming